Berne-Knox-Westerlo Junior-Senior High School is a public high school located in Berne, Albany County, New York, U.S.A., and is the only high school operated by the Berne-Knox-Westerlo Central School District.

Footnotes

Schools in Albany County, New York
Public high schools in New York (state)